Mitchell Prentice (born 2 March 1983) is an Australian footballer.

Club career
An AIS graduate, he played with Northern Spirit and Marconi Stallions in the NSL before trying his luck overseas where he had short stints with Scottish club Stirling Albion and Malaysian Super League side Pahang FA. A series of impressive performances during Perth Glory's 2007 pre-season trip to Malaysia secured a place for Mitchell on the club's list for the 2007-08 season.

Prentice left Perth Glory at the end of the 2007/08 season, after failing to negotiate a new contract. He was signed by Sydney FC for the 2008/09 season, on a 2-year deal with Sydney FC. He scored his first goal for Sydney in their first 2008 preseason cup game against Queensland Roar at Campbelltown Stadium in their 2-1 Victory. He scored off the free kick that resulted in Queensland's Seo Hyuk-Su being sent off for a sliding tackle against Sydney's Alex Brosque. Prentice played his first A-League match as a Sydney FC player on 30 August 2008 at the Sydney Football Stadium against his old club Perth Glory. Prentice played the full match in which Sydney FC won 5-2. Prentice decided to end his contract 3 months early with the Sky blues in early 2010.

Coaching career
Mitchell returned to Perth to take up a junior coaching position with Perth Glory. He coached there for 8 years.

He ran a football coaching business (P2P Football Academy) aimed at youth development. At (Prepared to Play) the focus was on key technical aspects of football for young players aged 8–14 years of age. P2P enhanced each individuals skills level and helped young footballers progress through practicing game relevant skills and techniques. Outlined in each training session were the four core skills from the FFA curriculum which were met in realistic game situations.
The program was run in conjunction with Melville City FC, the largest football club in WA.

After a period as head coach of the WA State team, Mitchell moved to Bayswater in 2018 to take on the role of Development/Academy Director 6yrs-12 yrs. In addition he coaches two of their junior NPL squads.

References

External links
 Oz Football profile

1983 births
Living people
Sportspeople from Wollongong
Australian soccer players
Australian expatriate soccer players
A-League Men players
Perth Glory FC players
Stirling Albion F.C. players
Sydney FC players
Marconi Stallions FC players
Ulisses FC players
National Soccer League (Australia) players
Association football defenders
Association football midfielders